Carmit Maile Bachar (born September 4, 1974), known professionally as Carmit, is an American singer, dancer, model, actress and showgirl. She is a member of the Pussycat Dolls. She is married to longtime partner Kevin Whitaker and gave birth to her daughter in 2011.

In November 2019, it was announced that Carmit had rejoined the Pussycat Dolls for their 2020 reunion tour. They released their comeback single React on February 7, 2020.

Early life
Bachar was born in Los Angeles, her father is of Jewish Israeli descent and her mother is of Indonesian, Dutch and Chinese descent. She was born with a cleft lip and cleft palate. She was raised in Encino, California. Both parents were dancers; her mother worked as a dance teacher at Bancroft Middle School of Performing Arts and her father worked with Elvis Presley and Marcel Marceau. Bachar competed internationally as a rhythmic gymnast for 10 years, and placed 5th in the U.S. Olympic trials in 1992. During her career competing on the U.S. National Team, she attended Hamilton Academy of Music in Los Angeles, studying music, dance, piano and viola. But throughout the years of talent, she endured the years of cleft surgery and was also the victim of bullying.

The Pussycat Dolls

Bachar joined the Pussycat Dolls in 1995 while they were a burlesque show. In 2002, she brought her friend Gwen Stefani to perform at the Pussycat Dolls show. Stefani brought along Interscope's Ron Fair and Jimmy Iovine. Later, the Dolls got signed at Interscope Records.

Carmit was a member of the Pussycat Dolls longer than any other performer being that she started in 1995 with the Burlesque show and left in 2008 after five years with the recording group. She was also the first doll to be signed into the recording group. Most of the then members, including lead singer Nicole Scherzinger and back-up singer Melody Thornton, were cast by co-founder Robin Antin in 2003, when the group was being transformed into pop recording artists.

In 2006 and 2007, she toured with the Dolls in support of their multi-million selling album PCD. She was one of the three lead vocalists in the group, and had lead parts in the songs "We Went as Far as We Felt Like Going", "Beep", "Buttons", "I Don't Need a Man", "Hot Stuff (I Want You Back)", "Right Now" and "Tainted Love", "Fever", "Whole Lotta Love", among others.

In February 2008, reports surfaced that she was leaving the Pussycat Dolls to pursue solo projects. On March 8, 2008, Bachar officially announced her departure from the Pussycat Dolls on the group's official website.

Thornton gave Bachar special thanks in the 'Thank You' section of the Pussycat Dolls' second album Doll Domination.

In November 2019, it was announced that the group had reformed and were going on a reunion tour in 2020. On December 5, Bachar and Jessica Sutta announced during an interview with Entertainment Tonight that a new album was in the works.

On February 7, 2020, the group's comeback single, "React" was released. The reunion tour was officially cancelled in January 2022. According to a joint statement made by Bachar and Sutta, they were unaware of the cancellation until they saw Scherzinger’s Instagram post.

Solo career

Actress and dancer
Bachar has appeared in several films, including 13 Going on 30, Along Came Polly, The Scorpion King and 2003's Charlie's Angels: Full Throttle featuring the Pussycat Dolls. In 1997, she was credited as a dancer in the Nickelodeon film Good Burger.

As a freelance dancer she has toured or appeared live with several rock/pop acts. In 1999 and 2000, she was the "Livin' La Vida Loca" woman in Ricky Martin's world tour. In 2003 No Doubt's world tour, and appears on stage with Gwen Stefani during "Bathwater" in No Doubt's DVD Rock Steady Live. In 2001, she was a dancer for Aaliyah's music video "Rock the Boat". In 2004 she was a back-up dancer for Janet Jackson during the infamous Super Bowl half-time show. In 2004, she was a dancer for Beyoncé's tours and appears on Her 2004 DVD Live at Wembley. She appeared in more than 21 music videos including Macy Gray's "Sexual Revolution", Jennifer Lopez's "Ain't It Funny", Wyclef Jean's "Perfect Gentleman", the Black Eyed Peas's "Shut Up", Michael Jackson's "Blood On The Dance Floor", Aaliyah's "Rock the Boat", the Offspring's "Why Don't You Get a Job?", and also Beyoncé's "Crazy in Love" and "Baby Boy".

The Zodiac Show
In 2001 in Los Angeles, Bachar, Lee Cherry, Scarlett Cherry and others started an 'underground' nightclub called Freedom. This became the occasional "multi-genre cabaret" which was first held at the Hollywood Athletic Club, then The Key Club. As of 2006, Bachar is still co-producing the event, which is now called The Zodiac Show. In August 2008 it was reported that Bachar will be doing another Zodiac Show, which she described as "a rock 'n' roll version of Cirque Du Soleil". The 2008 show was a success and The Zodiac Show may tour outside of the US.

Charity
It has been reported that she wishes to form a non-profit organization called "Smile With Me": "I want to have my own charity for children and adults who are born with a cleft palate. I was born with one and I want to educate and inspire people by saying that inner beauty is more important than looks."

Bachar is an ambassador of "Operation Smile", a worldwide children's medical charity that helps improve the health and lives of children and young adults born with facial deformities. In November 2007, she participated in an Operation Smile international medical mission in Bolivia, where she and her team organized creative stations for the kids like face and body painting, bookmaking, music and dance.

Solo music and LadyStation
Bachar is featured in the 2007 song "Lo-Down" by Storm Lee on his album Soulfillapopkilla. Meanwhile, she recorded background vocals for Macy Gray's album Big. She also collaborated with Vikter Duplaix on an upcoming song of his.

Bachar recorded background vocals for a single by Macy Gray, called "Beauty in the World".

In an interview with E! from March 2008, she mentioned that she wants to release a solo album in the future. In another interview with Savvy.com she said she worked with Macy Gray and that her album will be released in 2009. In June 2008, a song called "Carmasutra" appeared on Bachar's MySpace. She confirmed in her blog that it's an older demo song. In December 2008, an unfinished version of "Overrated" was leaked. In June 2009, she performed a new song called "Fierce" in nightclubs. It was produced by Jared Lee Gosselin, and written by Carmit Bachar, Kay Cola and Che'Nelle. Other producers she worked with are among others Justin Michael, Phillipe Bianco, Leo Mellace and Steve Catizone.  Bachar's album was set to be released in early or mid-2010.

In the September 2009 issue of Kee Magazine, Bachar revealed that her album will be titled "Formerly Of...". 
On 18. March 2010, rapper Detroit Diamond released an EP which featured a track with Bachar titled "Something 'Bout You", as well as her solo songs "Fierce" and "Cream". The EP, produced by Jared Lee Gosselin, is available on HMV.com.hk and also on iTunes and Amazon as digital download.
A music video for the song "Keep On Smiling" will be released in 2012.

With the LadyStation she released their debut song "Body In Motion" in 2011. In July 2012, the duo released a single "Motivation" with DJ Paul Thomas.

On February 24, 2017, Bachar release her first official single "It's Time" under her stage name "Carmit".

Discography

Extended plays

Official singles

Promotional singles

As featured artist

As backing vocalist

Music videos

As solo artist

Video appearance

Tours

Other recording songs

Awards and nominations

References

External links

 
 
 Official site of Carmit's charity "Smile With Me"
 Zodiac Show official site

1974 births
American people of Chinese-Indonesian descent
American people of Dutch-Indonesian descent
American people of Israeli descent
American people of Jewish descent
American musicians of Chinese descent
American musicians of Indonesian descent
American models of Indonesian descent
Actresses from Los Angeles
American dance musicians
American female dancers
Dancers from California
American women pop singers
American contemporary R&B singers
Naturalized citizens of Israel
Israeli people of Chinese descent
Israeli people of Indonesian descent
Israeli people of American-Jewish descent
Israeli people of Dutch descent
Indo people
Participants in American reality television series
The Pussycat Dolls members
Female models from California
Living people
American models of Chinese descent
21st-century American women singers